Brueckner is a surname of German origin. Notable people with the surname include:

Benedikt Brueckner (born 1990), German professional ice hockey player
Georg F Brueckner (1930–1992), German martial arts pioneer and inventor
Guenter Brueckner (1934–1998), American solar physicist
Keith Brueckner (1924–2014), American theoretical physicist

German toponymic surnames

German-language surnames